Kudahagala (also known as Agrabopath or Agra Bopath) is a  mountain situated in Sri Lanka. It is the 4th tallest in the country.

See also 
 List of mountains of Sri Lanka

References 

Mountains of Sri Lanka
Populated places in Nuwara Eliya District
Landforms of Nuwara Eliya District